The Ling Liang Chinese Church Trust at Tiretta of Kolkata, India was founded in 1961 by David Lamb and Mary Lamb, missionaries from Shanghai, China working with Timothy Dzao.

History
The Lambs arrived in India in 1949 and founded the Trust in 1961.

Organization
The Trust has two churches, Grace Ling Liang Church and Ling Liang Chinese Church, and two schools, Grace Ling Liang English School and Ling Liang High School under its umbrella.

References

Culture of Kolkata
Christian organizations established in 1961
Churches in Kolkata